

Bananaphone is a children's album released by Raffi and Michael Creber in 1994. The album is best known for its title track, which uses puns  such as "It's a phone with appeal!" (a peel) and nonce words like "bananular" and "interactive-odular" as Raffi extols the virtues of his unique telephone.

The song "C-A-N-A-D-A" was originally recorded by Stompin' Tom Connors under the title "Cross Canada".

The album was certified Gold by the CRIA in March 2002.

Track listing 
 "Bananaphone" (Creber, Raffi) 3:12
 "Shake a Toe" (Creber, Raffi) 2:20
 "The World We Love" (Creber, Raffi) 3:23
 "Slow Day" (Creber, Raffi) 3:25
 "The Changing Garden of Mr. Bell" (Hubbard, Silversher) 4:07
 "Naturally" (Creber, Raffi) 3:04
 "Spring Flowers" [instrumental] (Raffi) 2:40
 "C-A-N-A-D-A" (Connors) 2:50
 "Michael Row the Boat Ashore" (Traditional) 3:25
 "First Peoples" (Creber, Raffi) 4:37
 "Dee Myth" [instrumental] (Raffi) 2:21
 "Cowlit Night" (Raffi) 3:21
 "The Gorilla Song" (Knowles, Knowles) 2:10
 "Simple Gifts" (Traditional) 2:15
 "Down by the Riverside" (Traditional) 3:13
 "The Shmenge Polka" [instrumental] (A Tribute to the late John Candy) (Raffi) 2:07

Cover versions 
The album's title track has been covered in several different musical genres. Examples include a barbershop version, several heavy metal versions, a dubstep version and a bluegrass/country version by Rhonda Vincent released on the album Sing Along with Putumayo released by Putumayo World Music.

The Chilean children's show Cachureos released a cover of Bananaphone called "Teléfono" on its 1996 album, "La Mosca".

Flash Animation 
On May 4 2004, Dave Teatro and Will from "The Friend Society" released a Flash animation on Newgrounds titled "Banana Phone".

The animation depicts a group of three men.  One of the men hears the song Bananaphone playing inside of his head, but nobody else can hear the song.  He later goes insane from hearing it for hours on end, then collapses on the ground dead.  The second man checks on the body, then the Bananaphone song starts playing in his head.  The third man comes into contact with the second man, then the Bananaphone song starts playing in his head.  The third man punches the second man to death as revenge for getting the Bananaphone song stuck into his head.

Shortly after the animation was released, it reached the all time Top 50, and remained there until November 2004.  By then, it had reached over one million views.  The animation had gone viral, and was posted on many other websites.

References 

1994 albums
Bananas in popular culture
MCA Records albums
Raffi (musician) albums
Rounder Records albums
Songs about telephones